Albert Thake (September 21, 1849 – September 1, 1872) was an English professional baseball left fielder for the Brooklyn Atlantics of the National Association. Joining the team in 1872, he played 18 games for them, batting .295 with 14 runs scored, 23 hits, 2 doubles, 2 triples, 0 home runs, 15 runs batted in (RBI), and 2 stolen bases. Thake died on September 1, 1872, when he drowned off the coast of Fort Hamilton while fishing.

Early life
Albert Thake was born on September 21, 1849, in Wymondham, England. His family moved to Brooklyn, New York, during his youth. Becoming interested in baseball, Thake played for well-known local amateur teams such as the Star Club and the Athletics.

Professional career
The National Association became the first professional baseball league in 1871, and Thake a left fielder for its Brooklyn Atlantics in 1872. He made his debut on June 13, recording a hit in five at bats as the Atlantics were defeated 17–7 by the Baltimore Canaries. On July 29, he had a career-high four runs batted in (RBI), though the effort came in a 17–12 loss to the Boston Red Stockings. He had three RBI on August 6 in a 15–8 victory over the Middletown Mansfields. Thake's only appearance at a position other than left field came on August 22, when he played second base during part of a 15–4 loss to the New York Mutuals. In his last game of the season, on August 28, he had a hit, a run scored, and an RBI in a 26–12 loss to the Philadelphia Athletics.

Death

On September 1, 1872, Thake and a friend went fishing at Fort Hamilton, near where the Verrazano-Narrows Bridge is now located. They had just caught a fish when a wave forced Thake into the water. The New York Post reported that he was caught in fishing nets, while The New York Times stated that the current swept him away. Whatever the case, he drowned, and his body was later discovered on the banks of Bass Creek in Raritan Bay. He was just 22.

The Atlantics postponed their game against the Brooklyn Eckfords on September 2, and both teams flew flags at half mast at their baseball fields. On September 10, Thake's funeral was held at his mother's home, following which he was buried at Green-Wood Cemetery in Brooklyn. Thake's teammate and manager Bob Ferguson arranged a benefit game on October 23 to help raise money to cover Mrs. Thake's expenses.  Former members of the Brooklyn Atlantics and members of the 1869 Cincinnati Red Stockings played against each other in the game. Notable participants included future Hall of Fame members Albert Spalding, George Wright, and Harry Wright. Weather was poor the day of the game, causing the proceeds to total about $300.

Career statistics and reputation
In 18 games (78 at bats), Thake batted .295 with 14 runs scored, 23 hits, 2 doubles, 2 triples, 0 home runs, 15 RBI, and 2 stolen bases. In The Cooperstown Chronicles (2014), Frank Russo writes, "His .295 lifetime batting average suggests that he might have had a promising career ahead of him." Thake was well-liked by his contemporaries, both those he played baseball with and those he knew from his personal life. They thought he had exemplary character.

See also
 List of baseball players who died during their careers

References

External links

Al Thake's Obituaries 

1849 births
1872 deaths
Major League Baseball players from the United Kingdom
Major League Baseball players from England
English baseball players
Sportspeople from Norfolk
People from Wymondham
19th-century baseball players
Brooklyn Atlantics players
Major League Baseball left fielders
Burials at Green-Wood Cemetery
Accidental deaths in New York (state)
Deaths by drowning in the United States